Emidio Massi (5 August 1922 – 13 August 2016) was an Italian  Socialist politician and former President of Marche from 1978 until 1990. 

Born in Ascoli Piceno, Massi was president of Marche for 12 years, between 1978 and 1990. Previously, between 1970 and 1978, he had served as vice president of the Regional Committee and as assessor for Industry, Crafts and Labour.

References 

1922 births
2016 deaths
 Presidents of Marche
20th-century Italian politicians 
People from Ascoli Piceno  
Italian Socialist Party politicians